The World Badminton Grand Prix Finals was an annual badminton tournament organized by the International Badminton Federation (IBF) to crown the best badminton player of the year. The tournament only invited the top eight players in the year-end world rankings. The tournament started in 1983, with the last tournament held in 2001 (delayed from 2000).

Location

* Held in 2001.

Past winners

Performances by nation

See also
 BWF Super Series Finals
 BWF World Tour Finals

External links
BWF: World Grand Prix
World Grand Prix Final Results

 
Badminton tournaments